Jack Raymond Clarke (born 23 November 2000) is an English professional footballer who plays as a winger for Sunderland. He can also play as a striker. He represented England U20s at international level.

Early life and education
Clarke was born in York, England, and attended Archbishop Holgate's School in York.

Career

Leeds United
After winning his division with under-8s junior side Heworth, Clarke joined Leeds United's academy in 2009, alongside Kane Rogerson and Niall Huggins. He graduated through their academy and, together with Huggins, signed a two-year scholarship with Leeds United in May 2017. After impressing for Leeds' under 23s, then head coach Thomas Christiansen revealed he was going to put Clarke in his first team squad for an EFL Cup fixture against Leicester City in November 2017. However, due to the club's not having a professional contract with him at the time, Christiansen did not want to alert other clubs. After interest from Premier League side Manchester City, on 24 November 2017 Clarke signed a professional contract at Leeds United.

For the 2018–19 season Clarke was given the number 47 shirt and made his professional debut on 6 October 2018, coming on as a substitute in Leeds' 1–1 draw against Brentford at Elland Road. He scored his first goal for the club in the 56th minute of the league tie against Aston Villa at Villa Park on 23 December 2018, having come on as a half-time substitute for Jack Harrison. He made his first career start in the FA Cup third-round game against Queens Park Rangers, playing all 90 minutes in a 2–1 defeat. Clarke made his first league start for Leeds in a 2–0 win against Derby County on 11 January 2019, and received plaudits in the same match after assisting both goals and winning the man of the match award. During the second half of Leeds' 1–1 league tie at Middlesbrough on 9 February 2019, Clarke, who had been substituted at half-time, was stretchered off the substitutes bench in the second half and taken to hospital after collapsing. The ensuing 12 minutes of added time yielded the visitors' equaliser courtesy of Kalvin Phillips and Clarke was kept under supervision at James Cook University Hospital until the following day. After a spell out recovering with a virus believed to be behind the health scare, Marcelo Bielsa revealed that Clarke would return to training on 4 March. He returned to the first team on 16 March as a 77th-minute replacement for Luke Ayling and went on to make seven further appearances that season, albeit none of them as part of the starting lineup. He was one of three players nominated for the club's end of season awards for Young Player Of The Season alongside Tyler Roberts and Jamie Shackleton, with Clarke winning the award on 28 April 2019, at the club's annual ceremony. During the 2018–19 season, Clarke played 25 games in all competitions, scoring two goals, after Leeds finished the regular season in third place having dropped out of the automatic promotion places with three games left following a defeat to 10-man Wigan on 19 April. Leeds qualified for the playoffs versus sixth-placed Derby County, with Clarke coming on as a second-half substitute in the first leg of the playoffs (a 1–0 away win at Pride Park), and playing as a second-half substitute in the return leg as Leeds lost 2–4 in an encounter that saw Leeds down to 10 men after Gaetano Berardi was red-carded, the loss seeing Derby progress 4–3 on aggregate to the final against Aston Villa.

Tottenham Hotspur
On 2 July 2019, Clarke signed for Premier League side Tottenham Hotspur for an undisclosed fee until 2023. The fee was believed to be in the region of £10 million, with further add ons.

As part of the deal taking him to Tottenham, on the same day, Clarke re-joined Leeds on loan for the entirety of the 2019–20 season. He made his second debut for the club on 13 August in the EFL Cup against Salford City, and featured in the second round against Stoke City.

Clarke eventually made his first league appearance of the season on 23 November at Kenilworth Road, when he came on as a 71st-minute substitute in Leeds' 2–1 win against Luton Town for Tyler Roberts. On 27 December, Clarke's loan to Leeds was terminated early after he was recalled by parent club Tottenham by new manager José Mourinho, due to a lack of playing time at Elland Road, having made only three appearances during his brief return to the Whites. Leeds' manager Marcelo Bielsa commented, "I am very grateful with Clarke. He made his contribution in this part of the season, even if I didn't use him. In the last days, he improved his performance, but just when this process was going on Tottenham decided to ask Leeds for Clarke to come back."

He signed for Queens Park Rangers on a six-month loan deal on 16 January 2020 and made his debut for QPR two days later, coming on as a substitute against his former club Leeds in a match that ended in a 1–0 win for the Londoners.

Clarke made his debut for Tottenham on 22 October 2020, coming off the bench as an 86th-minute substitute for Carlos Vinícius in the Europa League against LASK.

On 14 January 2021 Clarke joined Stoke City on loan until the end of the 2020–21 season. Clarke played 14 times for Stoke before he suffered a season-ending achilles injury at the start of April.

He joined Sunderland on loan until the end of the 2021–22 season on 26 January 2022.

Sunderland

On 9 July 2022, he joined Sunderland on a permanent transfer for an undisclosed fee on a four-year deal.

International career
On 30 August 2019, Clarke received his first international call up as a member of the England U20s squad.

He made his England U20s debut on 5 September 2019 in a 0-0 draw against Netherlands U20s. Clarke scored his first goal for the U20s with the late winner during a 1–0 victory in Switzerland on 9 September 2019.

Style of play
Clarke is a versatile forward, who can play as a winger on either side. He can also play as a striker. He is known for his pace and his dribbling skills, as well as his ability to run at opposition defenders and take them on.

Personal life
Former Leeds United and Republic of Ireland left-back, Ian Harte, acts as Clarke's agent.

Career statistics

Honours
Sunderland
 EFL League One play-offs: 2022
Individual
Leeds United Young Player of the Year: 2018–19

References

External links

2000 births
Living people
Footballers from York
English footballers
England youth international footballers
People educated at Archbishop Holgate's School
Association football forwards
Leeds United F.C. players
Tottenham Hotspur F.C. players
Queens Park Rangers F.C. players
Stoke City F.C. players
Sunderland A.F.C. players
English Football League players
Premier League players